The Andaman Islands fall within the Indo-Burma biodiversity hotspot. While endemism estimated to be a modest 17%, the islands share about 65% of its tree species with south-west Myanmar. Early explorers like Wilhelm Sulpiz Kurz documented the flora of the region, and Charles Edward Parkinson published a Flora of the Andaman Islands with important tree species of the region. Since then, a number of tree species have been described. A comprehensive checklist of flora of the Andaman and Nicobar Islands has been published by the Botanical Survey of India - a 3-volume flora is currently under preparation of which the first volume was published in 2008.

List of species 
This checklist includes trees and other flora listed in Parkinson (1923). It includes most native tree species and some exotic trees species.

References

 
Andaman Islands
Andaman and Nicobar Islands